Anna Maria (Marie) Mancini (28 August 1639 – 8 May 1715) was the third of the five Mancini sisters; nieces to Cardinal Mazarin who were brought to France to marry advantageously. Along with two of their female Martinozzi cousins, the Mancini sisters were known at the court of King Louis XIV of France as the Mazarinettes. Marie is an ancestor of Queen Paola of Belgium

Early life and family

Mancini was born on 28 August 1639 and grew up in Rome. Her father was Baron Lorenzo Mancini, an Italian aristocrat who was also a necromancer and astrologer. After his death in 1650, her mother, Geronima Mazzarini, brought her daughters from Rome to Paris in the hope of using the influence of her brother, Cardinal Mazarin, to gain them advantageous marriages.

The other Mancini sisters were:
 Laure (1636 - 1657), the eldest, who married Louis de Bourbon, duc de Vendôme, the grandson of King Henry IV and his mistress, Gabrielle d'Estrées, and became the mother of the famous French general Louis Joseph de Bourbon, duc de Vendôme,
 Olympe (1638 - 1708), who married Eugène-Maurice of Savoy-Carignano and became the mother of the famous Austrian general Prince Eugene of Savoy, 
 Hortense (1646 - 1699), the beauty of the family, escaped her abusive husband, Armand-Charles de la Porte, duc de La Meilleraye, and went to London, where she became the mistress of King Charles II. 
 Marie Anne (1649 - 1714) married Maurice Godefroy de la Tour d'Auvergne, duc de Bouillon, a nephew of the famous field marshal Turenne.

The Mancinis were not the only female family members that Cardinal Mazarin brought to the French court. The others were Marie's first cousins, daughters of Mazarin's eldest sister.  The elder, Laura Martinozzi, married Alfonso IV d'Este, duke of Modena and was the mother of Mary of Modena, second wife of James II of England.  The younger, Anne Marie Martinozzi, married Armand, Prince de Conti.

The Mancini also had three brothers: Paul, Philippe, and Alphonse.

Youth

In France, Anna Maria's name was gallicized to Marie. "Dark, vivacious and beautiful," Marie captured the biggest prize of the French court: the romantic love of Louis XIV. According to Antonia Fraser's biography Love and Louis XIV, Marie's mother, Geronima, was told by a horoscope that Marie would cause trouble and demanded on her deathbed that Cardinal Mazarin should, "shut Marie up in a convent and keep her there."

Marie did not consummate her relationship with the Sun King. His love for her was a somewhat idealistic one, but he was so besotted that he wanted to marry her. Eventually, Cardinal Mazarin and the young king's mother, Anne of Austria, separated the couple, banishing Marie into exile and arranging for Louis' marriage to his cousin, Maria Theresa of Spain.

Exile and marriage

In 1661, Marie was sent away to marry an Italian prince, Lorenzo Onofrio Colonna, who remarked after their wedding night that he was surprised to find her still a virgin. The bridegroom had not expected to find "innocence among the loves of kings" (from Antonia Fraser's book Love and Louis XIV).

They had three children, all sons:

 Filippo, born in 1663
 Marcantonio, born in 1664
 Carlo, born in 1665

Escape and death

After the birth of her third child, relations between Marie and her husband deteriorated. On 29 May 1672, fearing that her husband would kill her, Marie left Rome accompanied by her sister Hortense. In 1667 a false memoir began circulating France about Marie, after her sister Hortense had written her own. Marie retorted by penning her own memoir. The Mancini sisters were some of the earliest women in France to publish their own memoirs. She did not return to Italy until her husband's death in 1689 and then spent a further decade travelling Europe.

She died in Pisa in May 1715 aged 75, little over 3 months before the death of Louis XIV in September that year, and is buried in the church of the Holy Sepulchre there.

In fiction and literature

Marie plays an active role in Letitia Elizabeth Landon's novel, Francesca Carrara, although her life following her encounters with Louis XIV is mainly fictional.

The character of Marie Mancini appears in the French musical Le Roi Soleil, where she was played by Anne-Laure Girbal. Her character appears also in the 2008 Italian novel Secretum by Rita Monaldi and Francesco Sorti and is the main character of the 2015 novel The Enchantress of Paris by Marci Jefferson.

Marie and her sister Hortense Mancini are the subjects of a dual biography, The King's Mistresses: The Liberated Lives of Marie Mancini, Princess Colonna, and Her Sister Hortense, Duchess Mazarin, by Elizabeth C. Goldsmith (2012, PublicAffairs).

Notes

References 
 Miller, John (1987). Bourbon and Stuart: Kings and Kingship in France and England in the Seventeenth Century. .

External links 

 Picture
 Picture

1639 births
1715 deaths
Nobility from Rome
Italian emigrants to France
Mistresses of Louis XIV
17th-century French nobility
Italian salon-holders
French salon-holders